The 2019 Uzbekistan Pro League is the 28th since its establishment. The competition started on 19 March 2019.

Teams

Foreign Players

League table

Goalscorers

References

External links 
 
Uzbekistan Pro League at PFL.uz
Uzbekistan Pro League News

Uzbekistan
Uzbekistan Pro League seasons
2019 in Uzbekistani football leagues